Salvatore Accursi (born 3 February 1978) is an Italian football defender. He is currently the assistant manager of Catanzaro.

Caps on Italian Series 

Serie B : 47 apps, 1 goal

Serie C1 : 126 apps, 1 goal

Serie C2 : 50 apps

Serie D : 66 apps, 1 goal

Eccellenza : 11 apps, 1 goal

Total : 300 apps, 4 goal

References 

1978 births
Living people
People from Locri
Italian footballers
A.S.D. Martina Calcio 1947 players
Association football defenders
Footballers from Calabria
U.S. Salernitana 1919 players
Serie B players
Serie C players
Eccellenza players
Serie D players
U.S. Catanzaro 1929 players
A.C.R. Messina players
A.C. Perugia Calcio players
S.S.C. Napoli players
Sportspeople from the Metropolitan City of Reggio Calabria